Francis Lewis (1713–1802) was a signer of the United States Declaration of Independence as a representative of New York. 

Francis Lewis may also refer to:

Francis Lewis (botanist) (1875–1955), English botanist
Francis Lewis High School, New York
Francis Lewis (MP) (c. 1692–1744), English politician
Francis Draper Lewis (1849–1930), Philadelphian lawyer, co-founded the law firm Morgan, Lewis, later Morgan, Lewis & Bockius
SS Francis Lewis on List of Liberty ships

See also
 Frances Moloney née Lewis, Irish socialite and nun
 
 
 Frank Lewis (disambiguation)